Close To You is an album by American pop singer Johnny Mathis that was released on August 19, 1970, by Columbia Records and mostly included his recordings of hits that other artists had that year. The exceptions were the new movie theme "Pieces of Dreams" and the 1967 songs "Wave" by Antônio Carlos Jobim and "Yellow Days", which was an Easy Listening hit for former Mathis collaborator Percy Faith. In the UK the album was retitled after a different song Mathis covered on it, "The Long and Winding Road".

The release of the first single from the album, "Pieces of Dreams", coincided with the release of the film of the same name, in which it is sung by Peggy Lee. The Mathis recording made its first appearance on Billboard magazine's Easy Listening chart in the issue dated September 12 of that year and got as high as number nine during its eight weeks there. The album's debut on the magazine's Top LP's chart came the following month, in the issue from October 10, and marked the start of a nine-week run that took it to number 61. A second single, "Evil Ways", had its Easy Listening debut in the November 14 issue and reached number 30 during its four weeks there.

Reception

Billboard wrote, "Among the standout performances are the title tune, 'Until It's Time for You to Go', 'Why Can’t I Touch You', 'Song of Joy', and 'Come Saturday Morning'. Top Ernie Freeman arrangements."

Track listing

Side one
"(They Long to Be) Close to You" (Burt Bacharach, Hal David) – 3:26
"Evil Ways" (Sonny Henry) – 2:36
"Come Saturday Morning" from The Sterile Cuckoo (Fred Karlin, Dory Previn) – 2:10
"Yellow Days" (Alan Bernstein, Álvaro Carrillo) – 2:40
"Pieces of Dreams" from Pieces of Dreams (Alan Bergman, Marilyn Bergman, Michel Legrand) – 2:44
"Song of Joy (Himno a la Alegria)" (Ludwig van Beethoven, Waldo de los Rios) – 4:00

Side two
"Everything Is Beautiful" (Ray Stevens) – 3:28
"The Long and Winding Road" (John Lennon, Paul McCartney) – 3:25
"(If You Let Me Make Love to You Then) Why Can't I Touch You?" from Salvation (Charles Courtney, Peter Link) – 3:15
"Wave" (Antônio Carlos Jobim) – 3:30
"Until It's Time for You to Go" (Buffy Sainte-Marie) – 3:55

2017 CD bonus track
This album's CD release as part of the 2017 box set The Voice of Romance: The Columbia Original Album Collection included a bonus track that was previously unavailable:
"Caroline" (Bodie Chandler) – 2:44

Recording dates
From the liner notes for The Voice of Romance: The Columbia Original Album Collection:
May 13, 1970 – "Caroline"
May 27, 1970 – "Everything Is Beautiful", "Evil Ways", "Until It's Time for You to Go"
July 10, 1970 – "Pieces of Dreams", "Yellow Days"
July 13, 1970 – "(If You Let Me Make Love to You Then) Why Can't I Touch You?", "The Long and Winding Road", "Song of Joy (Himno a la Alegria)", "(They Long to Be) Close to You"
July 15, 1970 – "Come Saturday Morning", "Wave"

Personnel
Johnny Mathis – vocals
Jack Gold – producer
Ernie Freeman – arranger and conductor
Phil Macy – engineer
Jim Marshall – photography 
Virginia Team – cover design

References

Bibliography

 

1970 albums
Johnny Mathis albums
Columbia Records albums
Albums arranged by Ernie Freeman
Albums conducted by Ernie Freeman